Staring Down the Brilliant Dream is a live album by the Indigo Girls, released June 29, 2010. "Staring down the brilliant dream" is a line from the lyric of their song "Love of Our Lives".

The album features contributions from Brandi Carlile, Michelle Malone, Trina Meade, A Fragile Tomorrow, Jill Hennessy, and Julie Wolf.

Track listing

References

Indigo Girls live albums
2010 live albums
Vanguard Records live albums